The 31st of February is the eponymous debut album by the trio of Scott Boyer (guitar, vocals), David Brown (bass), and Butch Trucks (drums).

Track listing
 "Sandcastles" (Dan Penn/Spooner Oldham/Chips Moman) - 2:55
 "Porcelain Mirrors" (Scott Boyer) - 2:55
 "Broken Day" (David Brown) - 2:56
 "Wrong" (David Brown) - 2:11
 "The Greener Isle" (Jackie DeShannon) - 2:45
 "Cod'ine" (Buffy Sainte-Marie) - 6:17
 "A Different Kind of Head" (David Brown) - 2:46
 "Pedestals" (Scott Boyer) - 2:25
 "Free" (Scott Boyer) - 2:29
 "A Nickel's Worth of Benny's Help" (Scott Boyer) - 4:22
 "Pick a Gripe" (Claude Trucks/Scott Boyer) - 2:06
 "Cries of Treason" (Scott Boyer) - 3:09

Personnel
Scott Boyer: guitar, vocals
David Brown: bass
Butch Trucks: drums

References 

The 31st of February albums
1968 debut albums